Lietuvos krepšinio lyga (LKL) (English: Lithuanian Basketball League), also known as Betsafe LKL for sponsorship reasons, is the premier professional men's club basketball league in Lithuania. It is composed of 12 teams, and it is a member of the Lithuanian Basketball Federation. The best LKL clubs are also annual participants of the top European-wide basketball competitions, including the top-tier level EuroLeague.

On April 22, 1993, the Lietuvos krepšinio asociacija (English: Lithuanian Basketball Association) (LKA) was founded. It was the first professional sports organisation in Lithuania. Lietuvos krepšinio lyga was built on the foundation of the LKA. Former basketball player Šarūnas Marčiulionis is named as the founder of the league. He was the first president of the LKL and served from 1993 to 2002. Remigijus Milašius is the current president of the league since 2013. The league's headquarters is located in Vilnius.

A total of 28 teams have competed in the LKL since its inception. Only two teams have been crowned champions, with Žalgiris Kaunas winning the title a record 23 times and Rytas Vilnius six times.

Competition format
The competition format follows a quadruple round-robin format, which means that during the course of a regular season, which lasts from late September to May, each club plays every other club four times, twice at home and twice away, for a total of 44 games. Teams receive one point for a win, and no points for a loss. Teams are ranked by total points, with the eight highest-ranked clubs at the end of the season plays the playoffs and the winner of the playoffs is crowned a champion.

Promotion and relegation
A system of promotion and relegation exists between the LKL and the NKL. The lowest placed team in LKL is relegated to the NKL, and the top team from the NKL promoted to LKL. However, the last team that has been promoted from the NKL to the LKL was BC Mažeikiai in the 2014–15 LKL season. No any team has been promoted to the LKL since 2015 because they were unable to meet the league requirements. In 2021-22 LKL season, for the first time since 2014-15 LKL season, 11 teams played in the league, NKL winner Cbet Jonava joined the existing 10 teams. Below is a complete record of how many teams played in each season throughout the league's history:

 1993–1994: 10 clubs
 1994–1995: 11 clubs
 1995–1999: 10 clubs
 1999–2002: 9 clubs
 2002–2004: 10 clubs
 2004–2005: 9 clubs
 2005–2006: 8 clubs
 2006–2007: 9 clubs

 2007–2008: 10 clubs
 2008–2009: 11 clubs
 2009–2011: 13 clubs
 2011–2013: 12 clubs
 2013–2015: 11 clubs
 2015–2021: 10 clubs
 2021–2022: 11 clubs
 2022–present: 12 clubs

Qualifying for European competitions
Žalgiris directly enters the EuroLeague as a licensed club. The highest-placed team, apart from licensed club Zalgiris, gets an invite to play in the EuroCup. The second and third highest-placed teams, apart from licensed club, get an invite to play in the Basketball Champions League.

In the 2021–22 season:
 Žalgiris competed in the EuroLeague
 Lietkabelis competed in the EuroCup
 Rytas competed in the Basketball Champions League

History

Foundation and Žalgiris dominance
The Lithuanian Basketball Association was founded on 22 April 1993, when eight of the strongest Lithuanian basketball clubs' officials met with representatives of the Šarūnas Marčiulionis basketball fund in Vilnius. The original eight teams were: Žalgiris Kaunas, Atletas Kaunas, Drobė Kaunas, Statyba Vilnius, Olimpas Plungė, BC Šilutė, Lietkabelis Panevėžys and Neptūnas Klaipėda. This association would soon be renamed to Lietuvos krepšinio lyga (LKL) due to legal issues, also announcing their that would start in the upcoming fall. By the end of spring, before the season started, the LKA and their new league accepted two more teams – Lavera Kaunas and NECA Kaunas.

Following the 1993–94 season, the finalists of last season's LKAL, Sakalai Vilnius & BC Šiauliai joined the league, while Drobė Kaunas decided to withdraw due to financial difficulties. The 1994–95 season saw the league's foreign players emerge as star power, before they were more known to be role players. In the 1995–96 season the league continued to accept the champions of the LKAL to the league, Savy Alytus joined the league. Sharpshooter Joe Vickery became the first foreigner to lead the LKL in scoring for Olimpas. League officials would start pressuring teams to play in better arenas by setting up certain criteria that were necessary to get accepted into the league. That's why no more teams were accepted until 1998 when Olimpas Plungė went bankrupt and was replaced by BC Kraitienė based in Marijampolė. Some of the strongest teams like Šilutė and Atletas faded away to the bottom of the league and left the league.

During this time period, the league had been dominated by Žalgiris. They won the league's championship trophy for six consecutive years, from 1994 through 1999. Their main rival during those years was Atletas Kaunas led by Saulius Štombergas and a young Žydrūnas Ilgauskas acquired from Žalgiris' youth team. Ilgauskas was selected 20th overall in the 1996 NBA draft, making him the first NBA player coming straight from the LKL. In 1999 Žalgiris, led by Tyus Edney, became the first Lithuanian team to win the top European basketball competition, the EuroLeague title.

Golden era of Lithuanian basketball
In the 1999–2000 season, Lietuvos rytas shocked defending EuroLeague champions Žalgiris by ending their dominant run. That sparked most likely the biggest rivalry in Lithuanian sports, the competitiveness has brought over to politics and society between the two biggest cities in Lithuania.

Modern era
2010–11 saw Žalgiris reclaim the title, beating Lietuvos rytas 4–1. In the finals of 2012 Žalgiris was the winner again, by sweeping Lietuvos Rytas 3–0. During the 2013–14 season, Žalgiris defeated Neptūnas in the final.

The 2014–2015 season saw the introduction of the 'four wheel system', where all the teams have to play 40 games with no exceptions for teams competing in international competition like the past. This year Žalgiris was able to finished 1st, but not before a dramatic win against Lietuvos rytas in the last game of the season 82–81.

Žalgiris continued to dominate in the playoffs sweeping rivals Lietuvos rytas once again in the final. Despite a familiar ending, the season was marked by the growing competitiveness of the league, Neptūnas joined Žalgiris and Lietuvos rytas as a powerhouse and this edition saw a couple of upsets and close games from teams such as Pieno žvaigždės and Juventus Utena. Although a strong competitor Prienai had to go through blank season. However, the final saw a two usual suspects once again - Žalgiris and Lietuvos Rytas. The Greens once again took the trophy back home by beating rivals 4–0. Team from Kaunas was led by all around sharpshooters in James Anderson and Artūras Milaknis who averaged 15.3 and 14.3 points a piece. The latter was named the MVP of the finals.

Six 2015–16 LKL season teams participated in the European tournaments: Žalgiris (EuroLeague), Lietuvos rytas and Neptūnas (EuroCup), Juventus, Pieno žvaigždės, Šiauliai (FIBA Europe Cup). Lietkabelis, Vytautas and Nevėžis competed in the Baltic Basketball League. Dzūkija was the only LKL club not participating in any European or regional tournaments. The off-season moves by teams such as the rebranded Prienai (Vytautas Prienai–Birštonas), Lietkabelis and the continued work from last season's playoff seeds gave fans hope for one of the most competitive seasons in league history. During the season, Žalgiris won 1st place in the regular season, over Lietuvos rytas. In the playoffs, Neptūnas shocked everyone, by beating Rytas in the semifinals, and reaching the finals for the second time in club history. In the finals, Žalgiris beat Neptūnas 4–1 to win again.

The 2016–17 LKL season off-season saw the rise of Lietkabelis, as tensions between FIBA and the EuroLeague resulted into them receiving a wild card as replacement in the EuroCup and greatly improving their roster which included signing the Lavrinovič twins (Darjuš and Kšyštof). A record of 8 Lithuanian teams competed in a European tournament that season, which added to the ever-improving competitiveness of the league. Consequently, the LKL achieved the average attendance record, with more than 2,000 spectators per game, during the regular season. Only Lietkabelis was able to fight defending champion Žalgiris, as Žalgiris easily defeated other top contenders Lietuvos rytas and Neptūnas. In the LKL semifinals, Lietkabelis beat Lietuvos rytas 3–1, to advance to the finals for the first time - they lost to Žalgiris 4–1. Rytas won the third place over Neptūnas.

In the 2018-19 LKL season, Dainius Adomaitis, the coach of the Lithuania men's national basketball team, joined the renamed BC Rytas as the new head coach. During the 2019 FIBA Basketball World Cup qualification, happening during the season, many LKL players debuted in the national team to play the games. BC Vytautas was renamed as BC SkyCop Prienai, signing veteran players like the Lavrinovič twins, Mindaugas Lukauskis and others. The team played improved basketball and reached the playoffs. Rytas won the King Mindaugas Cup, while BC Neptūnas finished the regular season in second place, earning home-court advantage for the semifinals for the first time in club history. Žalgiris once again won 1st place in the regular season. In the playoffs, while Žalgiris and Lietkabelis beat their opponents in sweeps, Rytas struggled against BC Juventus, 2–1, while Neptūnas defeated SkyCop 2–1. In the semifinals, Žalgiris easily swept Lietkabelis 2–0, while Rytas shocked Neptūnas with an even easier 2–0 sweep, even without home-court advantage. Setting up rematches from the previous year, the results remained the same - Neptūnas once again defeated Lietkabelis 3–0 in the 3rd place series, while Žalgiris easily defeated Rytas 3–0 in the finals.

During the 2019–20 season, the LKL board ended the season prematurely due to the coronavirus outbreak and crowned Žalgiris champions.

In the 2020-21 LKL season the LKL has reached a historic agreement - LKL will be broadcast in foreign countries for the first time since its establishment. During the 2020-21 LKL season, it was decided that in the next 2021-22 LKL season, 11 teams will participate in the tournament again after 6 years. Cbet Jonava  joined the other 10 existing LKL teams by winning the 2020-21 NKL season. For the 2022–23 season, the number of teams was further increased to 12, with the addition of the 2021-22 NKL champions Gargždai-SC.

Teams

Podium by season

 In 1994–95, 1995–96 and 1996–97 seasons no bronze medal game was played. Positions are determined by regular season standings of the semifinalists.

Performance by club

Awards

Lithuanian All-Star Game

See also
 List of Lithuanian basketball league champions
 King Mindaugas Cup
 King Mindaugas Cup MVP
 LKF Cup
 Basketball in Lithuania

References

External links
 
 Lithuanian league at Eurobasket.com

 
1993 establishments in Lithuania
Basketball leagues in Lithuania
Sports leagues established in 1993
Professional sports leagues in Lithuania